The 2005 Nebraska Cornhuskers baseball team was Mike Anderson's third year as head coach. The Huskers played their home games at Hawks Field.

2004
Nebraska posted a 36–23 record, with 14 of the losses being by two runs or less as they barely missed their first NCAA regional
appearance since 1998. However, the Huskers were the only Big 12 team not shut out during the whole season, and they established a school record and ranked eighth nationally with a .975 fielding percentage shattering the previous best of .971. A few honors include Big 12 player of the years and first-team All-American third baseman Alex Gordon and All-Big 12 selections Zach Kroenke, Curtis Ledbetter and Joe Simokaitis.

Preseason
The Huskers returned six everyday position players along with three of their top four weekend starters 
Will Bolt was promoted to volunteer assistant coach overseeing the infielders and assist with the hitters. He was on the staff serving as a graduate manager for the 2004 season.
Collegiate Baseball rated Nebraska's class of 23 newcomers, which includes 16 freshmen, six junior college transfers and Nebraska-Kearney transfer Joba Chamberlain, 16th nationally ranking which is the highest ever for a class of Husker newcomers.
Four high school seniors and four junior college transfers have signed National Letters-of-Intent to play baseball at Nebraska beginning in the 2005–06 season.
Alex Gordon was selected to the Brooks Wallace Award Watch List, Preseason NCBWA All-America First-Team, and was the Collegiate Baseball Preseason Player of the Year.

Roster

Schedule

Season review
Summary

While the 2005 Nebraska baseball season will be remembered for many things, it was the never-say-die attitude that captured the hearts of Husker fans around the state.

Heading into the final weekend of the season, the Huskers were two games behind Baylor in the conference race. Nebraska won its first two games against Kansas State, while Baylor and Missouri split their first two contests, putting the Huskers in position to earn a share of the league crown. Behind Kroenke's complete-game gem on Senior Day, Nebraska posted a 3–1 victory, while Missouri capped NU's title hopes by beating Baylor in Waco later that day, giving the two teams a share of the Big 12 crown. The two teams would meet one week later with the Big 12 Tournament title on the line. The game was scoreless until the sixth when Andy Gerch's sacrifice fly plated Gordon for the game's only run. Duensing and Jensen combined on a three-hit shutout to give NU a 1–0 win over the Bears and the Huskers’ fourth Big 12 Tourney crown since 1999 and winning the regular-season and tournament titles in the same season for the second time in school history (2001).

Never was the Huskers’ true spirit more evident than on college baseball's grandest stage – the College World Series in Omaha. Trailing 5–3 in the ninth inning, the Huskers were down to their last at-bat, looking to extend the most successful season in school history. As they had done 20 times during the season, Nebraska began to rally, opening the inning with two hits before Alex Gordon's RBI single pulled NU within 5-4. Two batters later, freshman Andy Gerch provided one of the most memorable moments in school history, sending an 0–2 pitch into the left-field bleachers, giving the Huskers a 7–5 lead. Alas, the lead was short-lived, as Arizona State scored twice in the bottom of the ninth – including a game-tying homer by Jeff Larish – before ending one of the most memorable games in recent CWS history two innings later for an 8–7 ASU win.

For Head Coach Mike Anderson, the heart shown by the Huskers was a characteristic that he saw develop throughout the year. "This was a resilient group all year long," Anderson said. "We fought and fought, and it didn’t surprise me at all that we scored those runs in the ninth." While its resiliency allowed the Huskers to never be out of a contest, Anderson credited the team's selflessness as the catalyst for going from eighth to first in the Big 12 and returning to the College World Series for the first time since 2002.

For Nebraska's eight seniors, 2005 capped a remarkable five-year run in which NU won 237 games, claimed three Big 12 titles and made three College World Series appearances.

"We’re at the World Series this year because we had a group of young men that gave of themselves for their team," Anderson said. "It's the most unique group of young men that I’ve ever been around. They bought into the team concept. They understood the team concept and got to where they are at because of the team concept. I can’t say how proud I am of them."

A total of six Huskers were selected in the Major League Baseball First-Year Player Draft, including four players in the top 10 rounds. Alex Gordon became Nebraska's fifth first-round pick, as he was chosen by Kansas City with the No. 2 overall pick. Brian Duensing and Zach Kroenke joined Gordon as players taken in the first five rounds, as they were picked in the third and fifth rounds, respectively. The trio's selections marked the first time that three Huskers were taken in the first five rounds of the draft.

Pitching

Nebraska relied on the combination of a dominant pitching staff, strong defense and clutch hitting to put together a 57–15 record and sweep the Big 12 regular season and tournament titles en route to a berth in the College World Series. The 57 wins not only led the nation, but easily topped the previous school mark of 51 set in 2000. The Huskers finished the year ranked as high as fifth in the national polls after opening the year at No. 50 in Baseball America's preseason issue. Also, their No. 2 ranking in Baseball America heading into the College World Series is its highest in any national poll since the 2001 season (a year the Huskers were ranked first for two weeks by Baseball America).

On the mound, Nebraska put together one of the most dominant staffs in Big 12 history. The Huskers ranked second nationally with a Big 12-low 2.69 ERA, the best by a Husker staff since 1969, holding 54 of its 72 opponents to four runs or less tying for the second lowest single-season ERA in school history. It also finished .03 off the Big 12 mark of 2.66 set by Texas in 2004. NU set single-season records for wins (57), saves (23) and strikeouts (538), while holding opponents to a .227 average. The heart of the staff was a four-man rotation of right-handers Joba Chamberlain and Johnny Dorn and southpaws Brian Duensing and Zach Kroenke. They won 15 straight decisions until Johnny Dorn's loss to Florida on June 19 at the College World Series. The quartet combined for a 37–6 record, as all earned All-Big 12 honors in 2005.

A transfer from Division II Nebraska-Kearney, Chamberlain took the Big 12 by storm, going 10–2 with a 2.81 ERA en route to third-team All-America honors. The Big 12 Newcomer of the Year and a first-team all league pick, Chamberlain was second in the Big 12 with 130 strikeouts and ranked in the top 10 in seven categories. The sophomore right-hander recorded five double-digit strikeout performances, including 15 against New Mexico in just his second start as a Husker. Chamberlain saved his best performance of the year until the Super Regional against Miami, which he fanned 13 and allowed one run over eight innings to out-duel Cesar Carillo in a 3–1 win.

Dorn became one of the Big 12's top freshmen, going 12–2 to capture third-team All-America honors. The Big 12 Freshman of the Year and a first-team all conference selection, Dorn went 12–2 with a 2.16 ERA, tying for the league lead in wins and ranking among the top five in the Big 12 in wins, ERA and opponent batting average. Dorn was superb in conference play, going 5–0 with a 2.08 ERA, as he earned the clinching win in five of NU's eight series victories.

Duensing returned from missing nearly two full seasons with an elbow injury to post an 8–0 record and earn All-Big 12 honors. Duensing split time between the rotation and the bullpen, but saved his best effort for the Big 12 title game, when he tossed 7.2 innings of shutout ball, as NU blanked Baylor, 1-0, to win the conference tournament title.

Kroenke rounded out the quartet, going 7–2 with a 2.82 ERA to pick up second-team all-conference accolades. The Omaha native saved his best efforts for NU's biggest moments, tossing a complete game against Kansas State to help clinch the Big 12 title. Two weeks later, Kroenke struck out a career-high 13 in a complete-game masterpiece against Creighton in the regional title game.

While NU's rotation was the envy of much of college baseball, the Huskers also relied on a talented bullpen led by closer Brett Jensen. The junior ranked third in the country with 16 saves to earn All-Big 12 honors, while set-up man Dustin Timm also earned All-Big 12 honors.

Offense

Offensively, the Huskers were led by the leadership and all-around abilities of third baseman Alex Gordon. A two-time All-American, Gordon etched his name in Husker history by becoming the first NU baseball player to be named national player of the year. The junior from Lincoln hit .372 with 19 homers, 66 RBIs and 23 stolen bases, as he topped the Big 12 in six categories and became the first player in seven years to repeat as conference player of the year.

Gordon was one of four hitters to receive All-Big 12 honors in 2005. Senior first baseman Curtis Ledbetter garnered first-team All-Big 12 honors, hitting .319 with 13 homers and 55 RBIs. He ranked fourth in the Big 12 in homers and was named MVP of the Big 12 Tournament, leading NU back to its fourth conference tournament title since 1999.

While Gordon and Ledbetter provided most of the offensive firepower, seniors Joe Simokaitis and Daniel Bruce provided leadership with their relentless aggressiveness on the field to instrumental roles in 2005.

Simokaitis finished his career as the Big 12's alltime leader in assists and routinely made spectacular plays look routine. A 10th-round pick in the MLB Draft, Simokaitis put together the best offensive year of his career, hitting .310 with three homers, 37 RBIs and 18 stolen bases.

Bruce shined in both the classroom and on the diamond in 2005. A second-team CoSIDA Academic All-American, he was named Nebraska's Male Student-Athlete of the Year and earned an NCAA postgraduate scholarship. Bruce also hit .322 with five homers and 32 RBIs to earn All-Big 12 honors.

Fans also turned out in record numbers to watch the Huskers in 2005, as NU averaged a school-record 4,984 fans per home game to rank sixth nationally. Hawks Field drew seven of its 10 largest crowds in 2005, highlighted by a school-record crowd of 8,771 for the Super Regional clinching win over Miami. NU enjoyed immense success at home, going 33–4 at its home park, including a perfect 5–0 during the NCAA tournament breaking the previous single-season home mark for wins of 29 set five times (1980, 1988, 2002, 2003 and 2008).

While Nebraska was dominant at home, the Huskers put themselves in position to reach the postseason with success on the road. NU went 15–6 in road games during the regular season, a total that ranked third nationally. In Big 12 play, the Huskers stayed in contention for the league title, going 8–4 away from Hawks Field and winning every conference road series for the first time since 1938.

Nine of Nebraska's 15 losses this season were by one run, as the Huskers finished 11–9 in one-run games. After having just one multi-homer game in 2004, Nebraska had eight this season, including four by first baseman/catcher Curtis Ledbetter and two by All-American third baseman Alex Gordon.

Stats
Hitting

Pitching

Awards

Mike Anderson
Big 12 Coach of the Year
Collegebaseballinsider National Coach of the Year Finalist

Jeremy Becker
First-Team Academic All-Big 12

Daniel Bruce
Second-Team All-Big 12
ESPN the Magazine Second-Team Academic All-American
 Nebraska Male Student-Athlete of the Year
First-Team Academic All-Big 12
 Big 12 Postgraduate Scholarship
 NCAA Postgraduate Scholarship

Joba Chamberlain
Collegiate Baseball Third-Team All-American
First-Team All-Big 12
Big 12 Newcomer Pitcher of the Year
Second-Team ABCA All-Midwest Region
Big 12 Pitcher of the Week (3/1 & 4/25)
Collegiate Baseball National Pitcher of the Week (3/1)

Johnny Dorn
Baseball America First-Team Freshman All-American
Collegiate Baseball Freshman All-American
Collegiate Baseball, ABCA and NCBWA Third-Team All-American
First-Team All-Big 12
Big 12 Freshman Pitcher of the Year
First-Team ABCA All-Midwest Region
2005 Team USA Invitee

Brian Duensing
Honorable-Mention All-Big 12
Big 12 All-Tournament Team
First-Team Academic All-Big 12
Collegiate Baseball National Pitcher of the Week (5/30)

Andy Gerch
College World Series All-Tournament Team
NCAA Lincoln Regional Most Outstanding Player
NCAA Lincoln Regional All-Tournament Team
Big 12 All-Tournament Team

Alex Gordon
USA Baseball Golden Spikes Award Winner
Xanthus Dick Howser Trophy Winner
Brooks Wallace Award Winner
ABCA National Player of the Year
Baseball America National Player of the Year
ESPY Award Finalist for Male College Athlete of the Year
Omaha World-Herald Ware Award Winner
Lincoln Journal Star Husker Athlete of the Year
Baseball America, Sports Weekly, NCBWA, ABCA and Collegiate Baseball First-Team All-American
NCBWA District VI Player of the Year
Big 12 Player of the Year
First-Team All-Big 12
First-Team ABCA All-Midwest Region Team
NCAA Lincoln Regional All-Tournament Team
Big 12 All-Tournament Team
Husker Power Lifter of the Year
Two Time Big 12 Player of the Week (3/22 & 3/29)

Brett Jensen
Second-Team All-Big 12

Zach Kroenke
Second-Team All-Big 12
NCAA Lincoln Regional All-Tournament Team

Curtis Ledbetter
First-Team All-Big 12
Big 12 Tournament MVP
Big 12 All-Tournament Team
NCAA Lincoln Regional All-Tournament Team
Second-Team ABCA All-Midwest Region Team

Phil Shirek
Second-Team Academic All-Big 12

Joe Simokaitis
Honorable-Mention All-Big 12
Big 12 All-Tournament Team

Dustin Timm
Honorable-Mention All-Big 12
First-Team Academic All-Big 12

Tony Watson
Collegiate Baseball Freshman All-American

Ryan Wehrle
Honorable-Mention All-Big 12

Rankings

Huskers in the MLB Draft

2005

2006

2007

2008

 Did not sign

See also
2005 Big 12 baseball tournament
2005 NCAA Division I baseball tournament
2005 College World Series

References

Nebraska Cornhuskers baseball seasons
Nebraska
Big 12 Conference baseball champion seasons
College World Series seasons
Blue Nebraska
Nebraska